The Micropeplinae are a subfamily of the Staphylinidae, rove beetles. Their antennae have 9 segments with single-segmented clubs. The tarsal formula is 4-4-4 (appearing as 3-3-3). They are found in leaf litter, near lake shores and marshy areas, in mammal and bird nests, probably as saprophages or mold feeders.  In North America, two genera are known Kalissus  LeConte 1874 (British Columbia and Washington) and Micropeplus Latreille, with 14 widespread species.

Genera
These genera belong to the subfamily Micropeplinae:
 Arrhenopeplus Koch, 1937 g
 Cerapeplus Löbl & Burckhardt, 1988 c g
 Kalissus Leconte, 1874 g b
 Micropeplus Latreille, 1809 c g b
 Peplomicrus Bernhauer, 1928 c g
†Protopeplus Cai and Huang 2014 Burmese amber, Myanmar, Cenomanian
Data sources: i = ITIS, c = Catalogue of Life, g = GBIF, b = Bugguide.net

References

External links

Staphylinidae
Beetle subfamilies